Hans Amler (born 5 November 1933) is a German politician from the Christian Social Union of Bavaria. He was Mayor of Ingolstadt between 1984 and 2002.

References

1933 births
Living people
Christian Social Union in Bavaria politicians
Mayors of places in Bavaria
People from Ingolstadt
Cartellverband members